Anubhoothikalude Nimisham is a 1978 Indian Malayalam-language film directed by P. Chandrakumar, written by Thoppil Bhasi, and produced by R. S. Prabhu. The film stars Soman, Jayan, Sharada, Adoor Bhasi and Sreelatha Namboothiri. The film has a musical score by A. T. Ummer.

Plot

Cast
K. P. Ummer
M. G. Soman
Jayan
Thikkurissy Sukumaran Nair
Adoor Bhasi
Sankaradi
T. P. Madhavan
Sharada
Seema
Sreelatha Namboothiri
Kaviyoor Ponnamma
Meena (Malayalam actress)
Pala Thankam

Soundtrack
The music was composed by A. T. Ummer and the lyrics were written by Sreekumaran Thampi.

References

External links
 

1978 films
1970s Malayalam-language films
Films directed by P. Chandrakumar